Jeremiah Christian Robinson-Earl (born November 3, 2000) is an American professional basketball player for the Oklahoma City Thunder of the National Basketball Association (NBA). He played college basketball for the Villanova Wildcats.

High school career
Robinson-Earl played his first three years of high school basketball for Bishop Miege High School in Roeland Park, Kansas. As a freshman in 2015–16, he started in all 25 games and averaged 12.4 points to help his team to a 22–3 record. As a sophomore in 2016–17, his team finished with a 22–3 slate. He averaged 14.2 points, 8.4 rebounds, 2.5 assists, 1.3 blocks, and 1.3 steals per game on a team that won a state title. He was a 2017 Wichita Eagle All-State selection and received a scholarship offer from Kansas. As a junior in 2017–18, he started all 25 games and averaged 21.3 points, 8.1 rebounds, 2.3 assists, and 1.3 steals in leading his team to a 22–3 record and a third-straight state title. After his three years at Bishop Miege, Robinson-Earl transferred to IMG Academy for his senior year.

Recruiting
Robinson-Earl was a consensus five-star recruit and one of the top players in the 2019 class. On October 30, 2018, he committed to play college basketball for Villanova over offers from Arizona, Kansas, North Carolina, and Notre Dame.

College career
Robinson-Earl made his Villanova debut in a 97–54 rout of Army, scoring 24 points and pulling down 13 rebounds. He was named Big East freshman of the week on November 11, 2019. At the conclusion of the regular season, Robinson-Earl was unanimously selected to the Big East Freshman Team. He was named Big East Freshman of the Year after averaging 10.5 points and 9.4 rebounds per game and had nine double-doubles. He was named to the Second Team All-Big 5. Following the season Robinson-Earl declared for the 2020 NBA draft but decided to return to Villanova after he was informed he would be a likely second-round pick.

Coming into his sophomore season, Robinson-Earl was named to the Preseason First Team All-Big East. On November 26, 2020, he scored a career-high 28 points and had eight rebounds in an 83–74 win against Arizona State. As a sophomore, Robinson-Earl averaged 15.7 points, 8.5 rebounds and 2.2 assists per game, and was named Big East co-Player of the Year. On April 9, 2021, he declared for the 2021 NBA draft, forgoing his remaining college eligibility.

Professional career
Robinson-Earl was selected in the second round of the 2021 NBA draft with the 32nd pick by the New York Knicks, and then was traded to the Oklahoma City Thunder. On August 10, 2021, he signed a contract with the Thunder. He was assigned to the NBA G League on February 3, 2023.

National team career
Robinson-Earl played for the United States under-18 basketball team at the 2018 FIBA Under-18 Americas Championship in Canada. He helped his team win the gold medal. At the 2019 FIBA Under-19 World Cup in Greece, Robinson-Earl averaged 12.7 points and 6.3 rebounds per game, helping his team win the gold medal.

Career statistics

NBA

|-
| style="text-align:left;"| 
| style="text-align:left;"| Oklahoma City
| 49 || 36 || 22.2 || .414 || .352 || .741 || 5.6 || 1.0 || .6 || .3 || 7.5
|- class="sortbottom"
| style="text-align:center;" colspan="2"| Career
| 49 || 36 || 22.2 || .414 || .352 || .741 || 5.6 || 1.0 || .6 || .3 || 7.5

College

|-
| style="text-align:left;"| 2019–20
| style="text-align:left;"| Villanova
| 31 || 31 || 32.7 || .454 || .328 || .814 || 9.4 || 1.9 || 1.1 || .5 || 10.5
|-
| style="text-align:left;"| 2020–21
| style="text-align:left;"| Villanova
| 25 || 25 || 34.5 || .497 || .280 || .714 || 8.5 || 2.2 || 1.0 || .6 || 15.7
|- class="sortbottom"
| style="text-align:center;" colspan="2"| Career
| 56 || 56 || 33.5 || .478 || .301 || .768 || 9.0 || 2.1 || 1.1 || .6 || 12.8

Personal life
Robinson-Earl's father, Lester Earl, played college basketball for LSU and Kansas before embarking on a professional career overseas.

References

External links
Villanova Wildcats bio
USA Basketball bio

2000 births
Living people
All-American college men's basketball players
American men's basketball players
Basketball players from Kansas
Basketball players from Kansas City, Missouri
Bishop Miege High School alumni
IMG Academy alumni
McDonald's High School All-Americans
New York Knicks draft picks
Oklahoma City Blue players
Oklahoma City Thunder players
Sportspeople from Overland Park, Kansas
Power forwards (basketball)
Villanova Wildcats men's basketball players